Roman Karl Scholz (16 January 1912 – 10 May 1944) was an Austrian author and Augustinian canon regular at Klosterneuburg. He became a resistance activist after attending a Nuremberg Rally in 1936 and was executed fewer than eight years later.

Life and death 
The illegitimate son of a textile worker, Josefa Scholz, Karl Scholz was born in Mährisch Schönberg (as it was known at that time), a prosperous manufacturing town in the northern part of Moravia in the Austrio-Hungarian empire. When he was six the empire was broken up and his home town was transferred to the new republic of Czechoslovakia. It remained overwhelmingly German in terms of language and ethnicity, but in a period of heightened nationalism the growth of the Czech speaking minority became a source of tension, and it was part of the regions which politicians were beginning to identify as the Sudetenland. Roman Karl Scholz grew up with his grandparents. He attended the Gymnasium (secondary school) in his home town. As a school boy he joined a local Catholic youth group, becoming a group leader. Sources relate that he wrote poems, loved nature and took an interest in politics.  He also "fell under the spell" of those advocating nationalist solutions to the Sudeten-German issue, which increasingly became identified with the idea that the Sudetenland should be detached from Czechoslovakia and attached to Germany in deference to the principle of Self-determination, which had been proclaimed as a guiding principal for reconfiguring the political map by the victorious governments in 1918/19. Then, in 1930, he entered Klosterneuburg Monastery (a short distance to the north of Vienna as a novice canon regular ("Augustiner-Chorherr"), taking the "religious" additional name, "Roman". He successfully completed his probationary period and was ordained into the priesthood in 1936. Between 1936 and 1938 he was employed as a chaplain in the Heiligenstadt district of north Vienna. In 1938 he started working as a teacher of religion at the Gymnasium in Klosterneuburg, and from 1939 he was teaching Christian Philosophy at the monastery's own school, also employed as priest for the military centre in the little town after war broke out at the end of the summer.

As a young man, like many who had grown up with the Christian Youth movement in Sudetenland, he was drawn to Nazism, even attending a party rally at Nuremberg in the summer of 1936. The experience proved a turning point, however, unmasking for him the ugly underpinnings of Nazi ideology. In March 1938 Austria was invaded by the German army and quickly became incorporated into an enlarged Nazi German state. That year Roman Karl Scholz teamed up with his friend Dr. Viktor Reimann to create the "German Freedom Movement" ("Deutsche Freiheitsbewegung") a resistance group of an essentially Catholic and conservative character. After war broke out, in September 1939, the group was renamed, becoming the "Austrian Freedom Movement" ("Österreichische Freiheitsbewegung"). Their political objectives were to start by educating people about the true nature of National Socialism, and then to accomplish the downfall of the Nazi regime. This should be accompanied by the extraction of the Danube and Alpine provinces from the recently enlarged German state, and the re-establishment of an independent Austrian state which would also incorporate Bavaria, thereby extending in a northerly direction all the way to the River Main. Some of the recruits were drawn from among the older school students whom Scholz taught. In the end, there were around 300-400 members. The movement also incorporated a women's group, organized around Luise Kanitz. They collaborated with the resistance group centered on Jacob Kastelic that led by Karl Lederer. There were contacts with the western allies and with Czechoslovak resistance groups.

Each member of the group took an oath of allegiance.   Those who swore allegiance presumably included Otto Hartmann, an actor from the Vienna Burgtheater. He was introduced to the group by his fellow thespian,  Fritz Lehmann. Neither Scholz nor Lehmann knew that Hartmann was a Gestapo spy. It was Hartmann who suggested that the group should embark on a programme of terror and sabotage.   Scholz rejected the idea which would have run counter to his Christian principles.   It remains not entirely certain whether Hartmann was already on the Gestapo payroll at this point, but in any case, in June 1940 he reported directly to the Gestapo everything that the resistance movement had been discussing and planning.

Scholz was arrested at the monastery, with four others, on 22 July 1940. He was held pending trial for more than three years. He was repeatedly interrogated during this period, and transferred from one prison to the next both in Vienna and further afield, but without betraying accomplices. An intervention by a sister of Reichsmarschall Hermann Göring, with whom a friend of Scholz had a connection, proved fruitless. He faced the special people's court in Vienna in February 1943. The indictment stated that he had brought about "the bringing together of people inclined to [political] opposition and drawn them into an organisation hostile to the state, for the purpose of splitting the Greater German realm" ("den Zusammenschluß von oppositionell eingestellten Personen herbeizuführen und in staatsfeindlichen Organisationen mit dem Ziel einer Zersplitterung des Großdeutschen Reiches zu sammeln"). A public defender was assigned to his case, and rather half-heartedly entered an "extenuating circumstances" plea, on the grounds that the accused was clearly a fantasist, as his poems demonstrated, meaning that there was no question of "guilt" as strictly defined. Roman Karl Scholz was condemned to death on 23 February 1943. Cardinal Archbishop Innitzer of Vienna submitted a personal plea for clemency by telegramme to Adolf Hitler, who failed to reply. Scholz himself had been convinced that he would be condemned to death from the moment of his arrest, and he was right.

Roman Scholz was one of approximately twenty resistance activists executed by guillotine on the scaffold at the district courthouse in Vienna on 10 May 1944. His final words were "Für Christus und Österreich!" ("For Christ and Austria!"').

References 

1912 births
1944 deaths
Austrian resistance members
Roman Catholics in the German Resistance
People executed by Nazi Germany by guillotine
Augustinian canons
20th-century Austrian Roman Catholic priests
People from Šumperk
People from Klosterneuburg
Moravian-German people